A fundamental principle in the field of acoustics, the acoustic approximation states that an acoustic wave is created by a small, adiabatic, pressure ripple riding on a comparatively large equilibrium (bias) pressure. Typically, the acoustic pressure is on the order of a few ppm of the equilibrium pressure.

By extension, the acoustic approximation also guarantees that an acoustic wave travels at a speed exactly equal to the local speed of sound.

See also
Sound

Acoustics